Italo Vincent Chelini (October 10, 1914 – August 25, 1972), nicknamed "Chilly", was a pitcher in Major League Baseball. He played for the Chicago White Sox from 1935 to 1937.

References

External links

1914 births
1972 deaths
Major League Baseball pitchers
Chicago White Sox players
Baseball players from California